WBZT (1230 AM) is a radio station broadcasting a sports gambling format. Licensed to West Palm Beach, Florida, United States, the station serves the West Palm Beach area.  With a synchronous amplifier in Pompano Beach, Florida, they also cover Fort Lauderdale, Florida. The station is currently owned by iHeartMedia, Inc.

History

The station went on the air as WJNO in 1936.  WJNO swapped frequencies on December 20, 2000 and the station changed its call sign to the current WBZT.

History Timeline
July 31, 1936: — WJNO signed on at 1 p.m.  According to the Palm Beach Post, WJNO was originally a CBS affiliate, and it aired everything from classical music to Steve Allen.

September 1943: — pollsters found that 94 percent of all radios in use in Palm Beach, West Palm Beach and Lake Worth were tuned to WJNO (1230 AM). At the time, the 7-year-old station was the only signal between Orlando and Miami.

August 13, 1979: — WJNO Program Director, John Picano, moves WJNO to a full-time News station.

1984: — WJNO switches from national syndicated talk shows during the daytime to local hosts.  Afternoon host Mike ("Captain Radio") Levine leaves for Tampa and Jack Cole from Boston, at that time 45 years old, takes the slot.  Cole referred to himself as the "Inquisitor General" and described his program as coming from "World Headquarters."

September 1984: — Barry Young is hired as midday talk host.  According to the Palm Beach Post, Young was a conservative "who believes in nuclear energy, the death penalty and, more often than not, Ronald Reagan. Abortion is repugnant, he says, and a vice-presidential candidate that goes by Ferraro-Zaccaro would be better off as a foreign sports-car."  Young was first heard on WJNO in early 1980 - 1982 when he was hosting overnights from Atlanta's WRNG (now WCNN) radio.  The program was broadcast on a small number of stations via GN (The Georgia Network) and FN (The Florida Network). Young came to WJNO from WGBS in Miami, where he angered management by leaving.  "Barry Young has a valid contract with this radio station," Lee Fowler, WGBS operations manager, said.

1986: According to the Miami Herald, WJNO runs constant local and state news, punctuated by national feeds, from 6 a.m. to 10 a.m. six days a week. Weekdays, local talk hosts work from 10 a.m. until 8 p.m., when a national talk show network takes over.
.

April 1987: Barry Young leaves to join the staff of new talk station KFYI Phoenix, Arizona.  John Broward and John Levitt did the program until late summer. This time there is no question that Young's contract allowed for his move. In Phoenix, Young would later become a founding partner in WestStar TalkRadio Network, a broadcast syndication company. WJNO carries programming, such as The Kim Komando Show originated bt WestStar.

1987: Mike Miller from WIOD joins the station.

May 1988: — Jack Cole moves to KFYI Phoenix, Arizona. Cole was hired by former WJNO midday host and then KFYI Program Director, Barry Young.  Lee Fowler, formerly of WNWS in Miami, moves into the slot.  Geoff Charles and Dick Farrel host the program in his absence.

January 1989: — Miller shifted to 9 a.m. to noon, Fowler moved to noon to 3 p.m., and Geoff Charles moves to the afternoon slot.  Syndicated Rush Limbaugh was on the station briefly.

March 1989: — Jack Cole returns from Phoenix.

April 1993: — Miller was fired and replaced with the syndicated G. Gordon Liddy show.  Miller returned the following year hosting afternoon drive at WBZT, then moved to Jacksonville and eventually left radio.

September 1994: — Randi Rhodes, then 36, is brought in from Miami's WIOD, where she was the evening talk show host.  General Manager George Mills said Rhodes would bring a "younger, more aggressive approach" to the station's lineup. "She's very talented. I think she'll be a positive addition," Mills said.

March 1997: — Fairbanks Communications purchased a station at 1040 AM and moved WJNO to that spot on the dial, after more than six decades at 1230, to take advantage of its strong signal strength in southern Palm Beach and Broward counties.

January 2000: — WJNO and WBZT swapped frequencies. WJNO moved to 1290 AM and WBZT moved to 1230 AM. The switch was designed to boost WJNO's signal in all of Palm Beach County but weaken it in Broward and Miami-Dade, where it competed with other Clear Channel properties.

July 31, 2017: WBZT changed their format from news/talk to sports, branded as "1230 The Zone", with programming from CBS Sports Radio.

June 9, 2022: WBZT changed their format from sports talk to sports gambling, branded as "1230 The Gambler", with programming from VSiN.

Previous logo

References

External links

BZT
Radio stations established in 1936
1936 establishments in Florida
IHeartMedia radio stations
Sports radio stations in the United States